South American Volleyball Championship may refer to
 South American Men's Volleyball Championship
 South American Women's Volleyball Championship